Monarchy referendums are referendums on the establishment, abolition, or restoration of monarchy or on the rules of succession.

Referendums on the establishment, abolition, or restoration of a monarchy

Referendums to choose or confirm a new monarch or to change the rules of succession

See also 
 Independence referendum

References

Monarchy referendums